Blood Run may refer to:

Blood Run (album), a 2005 album by Unsane
Blood Run (1978 film), 1994 Filipino action film
Blood Run (1994 film), 1994 film
Blood Run (book), a 2006 book of free-verse poetry by Allison Hedge Coke
Blood Run Site, a Native American burial mound site in the United States